Mission to Moulokin  (1979) is a science fiction novel by American  writer Alan Dean Foster.  It is the second entry in Foster's Icerigger Trilogy and is a part of his ever-growing series of books taking place within his Humanx Commonwealth.  The first book in the series is Icerigger, and the third is The Deluge Drivers.

Plot summary

The novel follows the continuing adventures of Skua September, Ethan Fortune and Milliken Williams on the frozen world of Tran-Ky-Ky as they try to help the native race, the Tran, win admission to the Commonwealth. During their struggle they deal with corrupt Commonwealth officials and an insane Tran leader, find the fabled city of Moulokin and learn of the history of the Tran.

External links

Alan Dean Foster homepage

1979 American novels
1979 science fiction novels
American science fiction novels
Humanx Commonwealth
Novels by Alan Dean Foster
Sequel novels
Del Rey books